Fujiwara no Ritsushi (九条立子; 1192 – 18 January 1248) was Empress of Japan as the consort of Emperor Juntoku.

In 1226, she ordained as a Buddhist nun and received the Dharma name Seijōkan (清浄観).

Children:

Second daughter: Imperial Princess Taiko (?) (諦子内親王)
Fourth son: Imperial Prince Kanenari (懐成親王) (Emperor Chūkyō)

Notes

Fujiwara clan
Japanese empresses
Japanese Buddhist nuns
13th-century Buddhist nuns
1192 births
1248 deaths